Jasmon Youngblood is an American-Lebanese professional basketball player for Sagesse Club in the Lebanese Basketball League. He played for Byblos Club in the 2016–2017 season and he averaged 21.2 points per game, 5.4 rebounds, 3.6 assists and 1.9 steals.

References 

 eurobasket.com

1984 births
Living people
American expatriate basketball people in Lebanon
American men's basketball players
Basketball players from Detroit
Junior college men's basketball players in the United States
Kent State Golden Flashes men's basketball players
Shooting guards
Small forwards
Sagesse SC basketball players